Rahuri  is a town and a municipal council in Ahmednagar district in the Indian state of Maharashtra.

Geography
It has an average elevation of 511 metres (1676 feet).

Demographics
 India census, Rahuri had a population of 34,465. Males constitute 52% of the population and females 48%. Rahuri has an average literacy rate of 70%, higher than the national average of 59.5%: male literacy is 77%, and female literacy is 63%. In Rahuri, 13% of the population is under 6 years of age.

History  
According to legend, the town was named Rahuri, after Rahu, a mythological figure in Hinduism. It is believed that Rahu's head touched ground at this place after it was beheaded by Mohini(Vishnu) from Newasa. Rahuri also has the second most important temple of the Hindu God Shani Dev.

References

Cities and towns in Ahmednagar district
Ahmednagar district